Lasarte-Oria is a railway station in Lasarte-Oria, Basque Country, Spain. It is owned by Euskal Trenbide Sarea and operated by Euskotren. It lies on a branch of the Bilbao-San Sebastián line and is served by the suburban Topo service.

History 
The station opened in 1998 as the southern terminus of a short branch from the Bilbao-San Sebastián mainline. It substituted a halt situated on the aforementioned line, and brought the train closer to the main population center of the town.

Services 
The station is served by Euskotren Trena line E2. It runs every 15 minutes (in each direction) during weekdays, and every 30 minutes during weekends.

References

External links
 

Euskotren Trena stations
Railway stations in Gipuzkoa
Railway stations in Spain opened in 1998
1998 establishments in the Basque Country (autonomous community)